Cornelius of Antioch (also romanized as Korneilos) was the bishop of Antioch between 127 and 151 AD or 154 AD, successor of Saint Herodian as bishop according to Eusebius of Caesarea. He was the first Christian leader with an aristocratic Roman name. Little is known about his deeds and life.

References

2nd-century bishops
127 births
150s deaths
Patriarchs of Antioch